Bellmount Tower is a historic tower, dating to the 18th-century, located near Belton Park, Belton, Lincolnshire, England. It is a grade II* listed building. It was commissioned by John Brownlow, 1st Viscount Tyrconnel as one of several buildings on the Belton estate. It was remodelled in c.1780, damaged by fire in 1841, and restored in 1989.

References

Grade II* listed buildings in Lincolnshire
Towers in Lincolnshire
Towers completed in the 18th century
South Kesteven District